In numerical analysis, given a square grid in one or two dimensions, the five-point stencil of a point in the grid is a stencil made up of the point itself together with its four "neighbors". It is used to write finite difference approximations to derivatives at grid points. It is an example for numerical differentiation.

In one dimension 

In one dimension, if the spacing between points in the grid is h, then the five-point stencil of a point x in the grid is

1D first derivative
The first derivative of a function f of a real variable at a point x can be approximated using a five-point stencil as:

Notice that the center point f(x) itself is not involved, only the four neighboring points.

Derivation 
This formula can be obtained by writing out the four Taylor series of f(x ± h) and f(x ± 2h) up to terms of h3 (or up to terms of h5 to get an error estimation as well) and solving this system of four equations to get f ′(x). Actually, we have at points x + h and x − h:

Evaluating  gives us

But for this calculation, it is left like that since the order of error estimation is not treated here (cf below).

Similarly, we have

and  gives us

In order to eliminate the terms of ƒ(3)(x), calculate 8 × (E1) − (E2)

thus giving the formula as above. Note: the coefficients of f in this formula, (8, -8,-1,1), represent a specific example of the more general Savitzky–Golay filter.

Error estimate 
The error in this approximation is of order h 4. That can be seen from the expansion

which can be obtained by expanding the left-hand side in a Taylor series.

1D higher-order derivatives 
The centered difference formulas for five-point stencils approximating second, third, and fourth derivatives are

The errors in these approximations are O(h), O(h) and O(h) respectively.

Relationship to Lagrange interpolating polynomials 

As an alternative to deriving the finite difference weights from the Taylor series, they may be obtained by differentiating the Lagrange polynomials

where the interpolation points are

Then, the quartic polynomial  interpolating  at these five points is

and its derivative is

Evaluating the derivatives of the five Lagrange polynomials at  gives the same weights as above. This method can be more flexible as the extension to a non-uniform grid is quite straightforward.

In two dimensions 

In two dimensions, if for example the size of the squares in the grid is h by h, the five point stencil of a point (x, y) in the grid is

forming a pattern that is also called a quincunx. This stencil is often used to approximate the Laplacian of a function of two variables:

The error in this approximation is O(h 2), which may be explained as follows:

From the 3 point stencils for the second derivative of a function with respect to x and y:

If we assume :

See also

References 

 . Ninth printing. Table 25.2.

Numerical differential equations